Cornelia "Cor" Aalten (later Strannood, 14 September 1913 – 21 January 1991) was a Dutch athlete. She competed at the 1932 Olympics in the 100 m and 4 × 100 m sprint events and finished fourth in the relay.

In 1934 she won a national title in the pentathlon and a silver medal at the 1934 Women's World Games in the 4 × 100 m relay (with Cor Aalten, Jo Dalmolen, Agaath Doorgeest and Iet Martin).

Aalten worked as stenographer with the company Gerritsen en van Kempen in Zeist.

References

1913 births
1991 deaths
Athletes (track and field) at the 1932 Summer Olympics
Dutch female sprinters
Dutch pentathletes
Olympic athletes of the Netherlands
People from Breukelen
Olympic female sprinters
Sportspeople from Utrecht (province)
20th-century Dutch women
20th-century Dutch people